The University of Cuenca (Spanish: Universidad de Cuenca) is an Ecuadorian university located in Cuenca. University of Cuenca is the principal university of Azuay Province. The university was officially founded in 1867, being the first university on Cuenca.

History 
Created under the presidency of Jerónimo Carrión y Palacio, on October 15, 1867, under the name of University Corporation of Azuay and the faculties of Jurisprudence, of Medicine and Pharmacy, of Philosophy and Literature and of Theology. His first rector was the Ecuadorian lawyer and politician Benigno Malo .

In 1868 the chairs of Industrial Chemistry, Botany, Zoology, Geology, Engineering, Lithography and Engraving were created under the leadership of German professors. As a result of this, the Faculty of Sciences was created in 1890. On May 24, 1882, the Public Library of Azuay is founded at the University. In 1897, after the Liberal Revolution, the then University Corporation of Azuay was recognized as the University of Azuay.

In 1919 the first student representation in the university was created. In 1925 the Public Library of Azuay takes the name of "Juan Bautista Vázquez". Later on 1926 the university was renamed as the University of Cuenca.

In 1935 the Higher School of Mines was created and four years later, the Faculty of Mathematical and Physical Sciences with the School of Civil Engineering.

Under the rector of Carlos Cueva Tamariz the Faculty of Philosophy, Letters and Education Sciences was founded in 1952, followed a year later by the School of Industrial Chemistry, now School of Chemical Engineering.

In 1958 Cueva founded the School of Architecture and Urbanism and three years later the School of Economic Sciences. Cueva Tamariz retired in 1966 leaving a modern and renovated university. Two years after his retirement, the School of Nursing and Social Work was founded.

In 1970 the President of the Republic, José María Velasco Ibarra closed all state universities until 1971.

After the reopening, the University created the schools of Business Administration in 1971, of Electrical Engineering the following year, of Sociology in 1975, and those of Medical Technology, Agronomic Engineering and Veterinary Medicine in 1979.

In the decade of the 80s the schools of Superior Accounting, Physical Education and Visual Arts were opened.

Faculties 

Currently the university is made up by the following faculties:

Architecture and Urbanism

 Architecture

Arts

 Musical Arts 
 Visual Arts 
 Dance and Theater 
 Graphic Design 
 Interior design 

Agricultural Sciences

 Agronomic Engineering 
 Veterinary Medicine and Zootechnics

Hospitality Sciences

 Gastronomy 
 Hospitality 
 Bachelor of Tourism Administration
 Tourism 

Economic and Administrative Sciences

 Business Administration 
 Accounting and Auditing 
 Economy
 Business Engineering 
 Marketing 
 Sociology 

Medical Sciences

 Nursery
 Career of Early Stimulation in Health
 Speech Therapy Career
 Imaging 
 Clinical Laboratory 
 Medicine and Surgery 
 Nutrition and Dietetics 
 Physical Therapy 

Chemical Sciences

 Biochemistry and Pharmacy 
 Environmental Engineering 
 Industrial Engineering 
 Chemical Engineering 

Philosophy, Letters and Educational Sciences

 Educational Sciences in the Specialization of Philosophy, Sociology and Economics
 Education Sciences in the Specialization of History and Geography
 Education Sciences in the Specialization of Language, Literature and Audiovisual Languages
 Educational Sciences in the Specialization of English Language and Literature
 Social Communication Sciences in Journalism and Digital Communication
 Social Communication Sciences in Organizational Communication and Public Relations
 Education Sciences in Mathematics and Physics Specialization
 Educational Sciences in the Specialization of Physical Culture
 Basic General Education 
 Film and Audiovisual 
 Initial Education 

Engineering

 Civil Engineering 
 Systems Engineering 
 Electrical Engineering 
 Telecommunications Engineering

Jurisprudence, Political and Social Sciences

 Law 
 Family Orientation 
 Social Work 
 Gender and Development

Odontology

 Odontology

Psychology

 Clinical Psychology 
 Educational Psychology 
 Social Psychology
 General Psychology

References 

Cuenca, Ecuador
Cuenca
Buildings and structures in Azuay Province